The Van's RV-7 and RV-7A are two-seat, single-engine, low-wing homebuilt airplanes sold in kit form by Van's Aircraft. The RV-7 is the tail-wheel equipped version, while the RV-7A features a nose-wheel.

The RV-7 was the replacement of the RV-6, replacing the RV-6 in 2001. It is externally similar to the earlier model, with longer wings, larger fuel tanks and a larger rudder to improve spin recovery characteristics.

Development

Van's aircraft designer Richard VanGrunsven designed the RV-7 to replace the RV-6, which was a two-seat side-by-side development of the RV-4. In turn, this was a two-seat version of the single seat RV-3.

The RV-7 incorporated many changes resulting from the lessons learned in producing over 2,000 RV-6 kits. The RV-7 also has increased wingspan and wing area over the RV-6, as well as more headroom, legroom and an increased useful load. The RV-7 carries a total of 42 US gallons (159 litres) of fuel, up from 38 US gallons (144 litres) on the RV-6.

The RV-7 shares many common parts with the RV-8 and RV-9, which reduces production costs. The RV-7 has a computer-assisted design with pre-punched rivet holes, helping to keep assembly time to about 1500 hours for the average builder.

The RV-7A version features a hardened, solid steel nose-wheel strut that fits into a tube welded to the engine mount. As in all nose-wheel equipped RV aircraft, the nose-wheel is free castering and the aircraft is steered with differential braking, or rudder at higher taxi speeds. The brakes are conventional toe brakes.

As of November 2022, 1,909 RV-7s and RV-7As had been flown.

Specifications (RV-7)
Specifications are given for 200 hp, IO-360 configuration with a Hartzell constant speed propeller

See also

References

External links

Van's Aircraft
Review in Kitplanes

Homebuilt aircraft
1990s United States civil utility aircraft
RV-07
Low-wing aircraft
Single-engined tractor aircraft
Aircraft first flown in 2001